Ultra-high-voltage electricity transmission (UHV electricity transmission) has been used in China since 2009 to transmit both alternating current (AC) and direct current (DC) electricity over long distances separating China's energy resources and consumers. Expansion of both AC and DC capacity continues in order to match generation to consumption demands while minimizing transmission losses. Decarbonization improvements will result from the replacement of lower efficiency generation, located near the coast, by more modern high-efficiency generation with less pollution near the energy resources.

Background
Since 2004, electricity consumption in China has been growing at an unprecedented rate due to the rapid growth of industrial sectors. Serious supply shortage during 2005 had impacted the operation of many Chinese companies. Since then, China has very aggressively invested in electricity supply in order to fulfil the demand from industries and hence secure economic growth. Installed generation capacity has run from 443 GW at end of 2004 to 793 GW at the end of 2008. The increment in these four years is equivalent to approximately one-third of the total capacity of the United States, or 1.4 times the total capacity of Japan. During the same period of time, annual energy consumption has also risen from 2,197 TWh to 3,426 TWh.
China's electricity consumption is expected to reach 6,800–6,900 TWh by 2018 from 4,690 TWh in 2011, with installed capacity reaching 1,463 GW from 1,056 GW in 2011, of which 342 GW is hydropower, 928 GW coal-fired, 100 GW wind, 43GW nuclear, and 40GW natural gas. China is the country with the largest consumption of electricity as of 2011.

Transmission and distribution
On the transmission and distribution side, the country has focused on expanding capacity and reducing losses by:
 deploying long-distance ultra-high-voltage direct current  (UHVDC) and ultra-high-voltage alternating current (UHVAC) transmission
 installing high-efficiency amorphous metal transformers

UHV transmission worldwide
UHV transmission and a number of UHVAC circuits have already been constructed in different parts of the world. For example, 2,362 km of 1,150 kV circuits were built in the former USSR, and 427 km of 1,000 kV AC circuits have been developed in Japan (Kita-Iwaki powerline). Experimental lines of various scales are also found in many countries. However, most of these lines are currently operating at lower voltage due to insufficient power demand or other reasons. There are fewer examples of UHVDC. Although there are plenty of ±500 kV (or below) circuits around the world, the only operative circuits above this threshold are the Hydro-Québec's electricity transmission system at 735 kV AC (since 1965, 11 422 km long in 2018) and Itaipu ±600 kV project in Brazil.
In Russia, construction work on a 2400 km long bipolar ±750 kV DC line, the HVDC Ekibastuz–Centre started in 1978 but it was never finished. In USA at the beginning of the 1970s a 1333 kV powerline was planned from Celilo Converter Station to Hoover Dam. For this purpose a short experimental powerline near Celilo Converter Station was built, but the line to Hoover Dam was never built.

Reasons for UHV transmission in China
China's decision to go for UHV transmission is based on the fact that energy resources are far away from the load centers. The majority of the hydropower resources are in the west, and coal is in the northwest, but huge loadings are in the east and south. To reduce transmission losses to a manageable level, UHV transmission is a logical choice. As the State Grid Corporation of China announced at the 2009 International Conference on UHV Power Transmission in Beijing, China will invest RMB 600 billion (approximately US$88 billion) into UHV development between now and 2020.

Implementation of the UHV grid enables the construction of newer, cleaner, more efficient power generation plants far from population centers. Older power plants along the coast will be retired. This will lower the total current amount of pollution, as well as the pollution felt by citizens within urban dwellings. The use of large central power plants providing electric heating are also less polluting than individual boilers used for winter heating in many northern households. The UHV grid will aid China's plan of electrification and decarbonization, and enable integration of renewable energy by removing the transmission bottleneck that is currently limiting expansions in wind and solar generation capacity whilst further developing the market for long-range electric vehicles in China.

UHV circuits completed or under construction
As of 2021, the operational UHV circuits are:

The under-construction/In preparation UHV lines are:

Controversy over UHV

There is controversy over whether the construction proposed by State Grid Corporation of China is a strategy to be more monopolistic and fight against the power grid reform.

Prior to the Paris Agreement, which made it necessary to phase out coal, oil and gas, there has been controversy over UHV since 2004 when the State Grid Corporation of China proposed the idea of UHV construction. The controversy has been focused on UHVAC while the idea of building UHVDC has been widely accepted.
The most debated issues are the four listed below.

 Security and reliability issues: With the construction of more and more UHV transmission lines, the power grid around the whole nation is connected more and more intensively. If an accident happens in one line, it is difficult to limit the influence to a small area. This means that the chances of a blackout are getting higher. Also, it may be more vulnerable to terrorism.
 Market issue: All other UHV transmission lines around the world are currently operating at a lower voltage because there is not enough demand. The potential of long-distance transmission needs more in-depth research. Although the majority of coal resources are in the northwest, it is difficult to build coal power plants there because they need a large amount of water and that is a scarce resource in northwest China. And also with the economic development in west China, the demand for electricity has been booming these years.
 Environmental and efficiency issues: Some experts argue that UHV lines won't save more land compared to building extra railroads for increased coal transport and local power generation. Due to the water scarcity issue, the construction of coal-fired power plants in the west is hindered. Another issue is transmission efficiency. Using combined heat and power at the user end is more energy efficient than using power from long distance transmission lines.
 Economic issue: The total investment is estimated to be 270 billion RMB (around US$40 billion), which is much more expensive than building a new railroad for coal transportation.

As UHV offers the opportunity to transfer renewable energy from remote areas with much potential for large installations of wind power and photovoltaics. SGCC mentions a potential capacity for wind power of 200 GW in the Xinjiang region.

See also

Southern Hami–Zhengzhou UHVDC

References

External links
Grid map Grid map, 2001

Electric power infrastructure in China
Electric power transmission